Ahmed Tantawi or Ahmed Mohamed Ramadan Tantawi (also: Tantawy) is an Egyptian journalist and politician. , he is a member of the 25-30 Alliance and a member of the Egyptian House of Representatives.

2015–2020 Parliament
Tantawi is a member of the 25-30 Alliance created for the 2015 Egyptian parliamentary election, whose name refers to the 2011 Egyptian revolution that started on 25 January 2011 and the 30 June 2013 protests that led to the overthrow of President Mohamed Morsi. He was elected to the Egyptian House of Representatives in the 2015 election in the individual component of the second phase of the election, along with 13 others in the alliance.

On 14 February 2019, Tantawi was one of the 16 members of parliament (MPs) who voted against the parliamentary motion for amending the Egyptian constitution, that led to the 2019 Egyptian constitutional referendum in April 2019. The motion was supported by 485 members.

Sisi 2022 departure proposal
On 3 November 2019, Tantawi posted a YouTube video in which he proposed that Egyptian President Abdel Fattah el-Sisi leave power in 2022, rather than in 2024 as defined in the 2019 constitutional amendment. Tantawi later discussed his video with Mada Masr, stating that his aim was to protect Egypt from the "imminent danger" of el-Sisi continuing in power too long, that it was consistent with el-Sisi's promises, and that this should satisfy el-Sisi's supporters.

Tantawi also submitted a formal request under parliamentary procedure to Ali Abdel Aal, Speaker of the House of Representatives, proposing that 12 parliamentary committees be created to "generate a national dialogue about the political, economic and social problems facing the country". He described his aim as a serious attempt to solve "the real crisis Egypt is living through, which authorities should pay attention to before it is too late" and that the proposal would help to "absorb public outrage". Tantawi expressed his worry that a violent reaction by authorities to his initiative would discourage "the people" from choosing political methods of change.

On 5 November in a parliamentary sitting, MP Mahmoud Badr called Tantawi's proposal an "outright violation of the constitution". Speaker Abdel Aal stated that he "[does] not have any initiatives" and "[does] not pay attention to this sort of talk. ... There are red lines, including the nation, political leadership and Egypt's military and police. Insulting them is not permitted." Ninety-five MPs submitted a request to Abdel Aal to refer Tantawi to the parliament's Ethics Committee, on the grounds that Tantawi's initiative "undermines the Egyptian state and its institutions".

The Civil Democratic Movement stated that it supported the initiative, which was consistent with its own 10-point proposal announced in late October 2019.

References

Members of the House of Representatives (Egypt)
Living people
Year of birth missing (living people)